Achille Le Tonnelier de Breteuil (1781-1864) was a French politician.

Early life
Achille Le Tonnelier de Breteuil was born on 29 March 1781 in Paris. He was educated at the Collège du Plessis. He graduated from the École Polytechnique.

Career
Breteuil started his career at the Ministry of Foreign Affairs, first in the cabinet and subsequently in Mainz and Stuttgart. He later served as an auditor in the Conseil d'État.

Breteuil served as the Prefect of Eure-et-Loir from 1820 to 1822, followed by Prefect of Sarthe and Gironde.

Breteuil joined the Senate in 1852.

Death
Breteuil died on 3 June 1864 in Paris.

References

1781 births
1864 deaths
Politicians from Paris
École Polytechnique alumni
Prefects of Eure-et-Loir
Prefects of Sarthe
Prefects of Gironde
French Senators of the Second Empire